70000 series may refer to the Japanese trains:

 Odakyu 70000 series GSE
 Tobu 70000 series
 TWR 70-000 series